The Putnam County Courthouse, built in 1909, is a historic brick courthouse building located at 410 St. Johns Avenue in Palatka, Florida It was designed by architects Robinson and Reidy in the Classical Revival style of architecture. C. D. Smith was the builder. It originally had a central cupola which is now gone. It has been extensively renovated and modernized over the years, with wings added on each side of the front portico.

References

Buildings and structures in Putnam County, Florida
County courthouses in Florida
Government buildings completed in 1909
Neoclassical architecture in Florida